Alfons Goldschmidt (28 November 1879, Gelsenkirchen – 20 or 21 January 1940, Mexico City) was a German Journalist, economist and university lecturer.

Alfons was born in Gelsenkirchen. He was finance editor for Rudolf Mosse's Berliner Tageblatt, and held the chair of economics at the University of Leipzig.

In 1919 he was one of the founders of the League for Proletarian Culture. He was co-editor of Räte-Zeitung with Leo Matthias.

He travelled to the Soviet Union in 1920, arriving in Moscow on 1 May.

He was chairperson of the German section of Workers International Relief.

Works
 Die Wirtschaftsorganisation Sowjet-Russlands (1920) Berlin: Ernst Rowohlt
 Moskau 1920; Tagebuchblätter (1920) Berlin: Ernst Rowohlt
 Argentinien (1923) Berlin: Ernst Rowohlt
 Mexiko (1925)
 Auf Den Spuren Der Azteken (1927)
 Whither Israel? (1934) New York, (with a foreword by Albert Einstein)
 The fate of trade unions under fascism (1937) New York: Anti-fascist literature committee
 Grosse Liebe, weite Welt oder zwischen Rio Bravo und Moskwa : Reise- u. Zeitbilder 1920-1940 (1974) Berlin : Buchverlag Der Morgen

External links

References

1879 births
1940 deaths
Anti-fascism in Germany
German people of Jewish descent